Kinbrook Island Provincial Park  is a provincial park in Alberta, Canada.

It was established on November 14, 1951 and is maintained by Alberta Tourism, Parks and Recreation.

It is situated on the eastern shore of Lake Newell, 12 km south of the city of Brooks and within the County of Newell.

Activities
The following activities are available in the park:

See also
List of provincial parks in Alberta
List of Canadian provincial parks
List of Canadian national parks

References

External links

County of Newell
Provincial parks of Alberta